Adam Shore is an American musician and the original vocalist for glam metal band Warrant. He sang on early Warrant demos such as "You've Got A Broken Heart" and "Tease Machine". He also co-wrote the Warrant song "Thin Disguise" (which was originally a B-side) with his replacement Jani Lane, with Lane ending up on the final recording.

Shore went on to front several other bands including Hot Wheelz (later Shake City),  which also featured former Warrant drummer Max Asher before switching to percussionist Jaycee Cary. 

Shore was also featured on several songs of Warrant guitarist Erik Turner's Demos for Diehards.

Discography

With Warrant
 You've Got A Broken Heart (Demo)
 Tease Machine (Demo)

With Eric Turner solo
 Demos For Diehards (1998)

With Shake City
 Shake City (2009)

References 

Year of birth missing (living people)
Place of birth missing (living people)
Living people
American rock singers
Warrant (American band) members